Any Old Iron may refer to:

 Any Old Iron (novel), a 1989 historical novel by Anthony Burgess
 "Any Old Iron" (song), a British music hall song